Quizzle was a website that offered a free VantageScore 3.0 credit score and a free TransUnion credit report every three months. Quizzle was a tool to help consumers gain a complete understanding of their credit and provides tools to help users repair their credit and report problems with their credit report.

The company, founded in 2008, was privately held and owned by Dan Gilbert. It was part of a "family" of companies that includes the Cleveland Cavaliers, Fathead, and Quicken Loans. As of April 2015, Quizzle was owned and operated by Bankrate, Inc.
 
In early 2016, Quizzle began using TransUnion as a replacement for Equifax, and VantageScore 3.0 for CE credit score.

In 2019, Quizzle was shut down and web site visitors are now directed to the site of its former owner Bankrate.

See also 
Comparison of free credit report websites
Credit Karma
Credit Sesame
Mint.com

References

External links 
 Quizzle.com Official Site

Financial services companies established in 2008
Financial services companies disestablished in 2019
2008 establishments in Michigan
2019 disestablishments in Michigan
Internet properties established in 2008
Finance websites
Internet properties disestablished in 2019